General elections were held in the Turks and Caicos Islands on 9 February 2007. The result was a victory for the ruling Progressive National Party (PNP), which won thirteen of the fifteen seats in the House of Assembly. PNP leader Michael Misick remained Premier.

Electoral system
Constitutional changes in 2006 saw the Legislative Council renamed the House of Assembly and the number of seats increased from 13 to 15. Members were elected from single-member constituencies.

Campaign
A total of 31 candidates contested the elections, with both the PNP and the People's Democratic Movement (PDM) running full slates of 15 candidates. The other candidate ran as an independent.

Results

References

Elections in the Turks and Caicos Islands
Turks
2007 in the Turks and Caicos Islands
Turks
February 2007 events in North America